Esmonde may refer to:

People
Given name
 Esmonde Higgins (1897-1960), Australian communist

Surname
 A. M. Esmonde (b. 1977), a British movie writer and producer
 Sir Anthony Esmonde, 15th Baronet (1899-1981), an Irish politician and farmer
 Eugene Esmonde (1909-1942), a British aviator
 John Esmonde (disambiguation), various people
 Sir John Esmonde, 14th Baronet (1893-1958), an Irish politician
 Sir John Esmonde, 16th Baronet (1928-1987), an Irish politician
 John Gilbert Esmonde (1937-2008), a British television scriptwriter who was part of the duo of Esmonde and Larbey
 John Joseph Esmonde (1862-1915), an Irish politician
 Laurence Esmonde (disambiguation), various people
 Laurence Esmonde, Lord Esmonde (1570?-1646)
 Sir Osmond Esmonde, 12th Baronet (1896-1936), an Irish diplomat and politician
 Thomas Esmonde (disambiguation), various people
 Sir Thomas Esmonde, 11th Baronet (1862-1935), an Irish politician

Titles
 Baron Esmonde, a title in the Peerage of Ireland
 Esmonde baronets, a title in the Baronetage of Ireland

Places
 Esmonde, a community in Bonnechere Valley, Ontario, in Canada

See also
 Esmond (disambiguation)